Strangers in Heaven is a 2014 album by the Japanese rock band Nothing's Carved in Stone released on August 6, 2014.

Track listing

References

2014 albums
Nothing's Carved in Stone albums
Epic Records albums